Mátyásdomb is a village in Fejér county, Hungary. It got its name from Mátyás Rákosi, a former Hungarian leader.

External links 

 Street map 

Populated places in Fejér County